Volos is a  port city in Thessaly, Greece.

Volos may also refer to:

Gulf of Volos
Volos (god), Slavic god
 SS Volos, several steamships
Andrei Volos, Russian writer

See also
Volo (disambiguation)